Monster Magnet is the debut EP by American rock band Monster Magnet, released via the German label Glitterhouse Records in 1990. The songs "Snake Dance" and "Nod Scene" would later be re-recorded for the group's debut full-length album Spine of God, released in 1991. The song "Tractor" would later be re-recorded for the group's 'Powertrip'' album, released in 1998.

Track listing
 "Snake Dance" - 3:21 (Wyndorf)
 "Tractor" - 3:25 (Wyndorf)
 "Nod Scene" - 7:15 (McBain/Wyndorf)
 "Freak Shop USA" - 4:37 (McBain/Wyndorf)
 "Lizard Johnny" - 5:25 (McBain/Wyndorf/Cronin)
 "Murder" - 3:37 (Wyndorf)

Personnel
 Dave Wyndorf – guitar, vocals
 John McBain – guitar
 Tom Diello – drums
 Tim Cronin – bass, additional vocals

References

Monster Magnet albums
1990 debut EPs
Glitterhouse Records albums